Walter Söhne (7 October 1913 – 24 December 2011) was a pioneer in research on soil mechanics (terramechanics) and on improving the design of agricultural vehicles (tractors etc.), and was a very successful teacher as a professor from 1965 to 1982 at the Technical University of Munich. He wrote many articles in German on related topics, and his Über die Historie der Bodenbearbeitungs- und Erntetechnik (1992) surveys the history of techniques of agricultural cultivation and harvesting. In the 1970s he served as president of the International Society for Terrain Vehicle Systems.

References

Notice of Walter Söhne's 95 birthday

1913 births
2011 deaths
German agronomists
Academic staff of the Technical University of Munich